Two destroyers of the Imperial Japanese Navy were named Satsuki:

 , previously the Russian Biedovy captured in 1905 by Japan and renamed. She was stricken in 1913.
 , a  launched in 1925 and sunk in 1944

Imperial Japanese Navy ship names
Japanese Navy ship names